Karkan-e Pain (also Romanized as Karkān-e Pā’īn and Karakān-Pā’īn; also known as Garakān-e Soflá and Karkān-e Soflá) is a village in Saruq Rural District, Saruq District, Farahan County, Markazi Province, Iran. At the 2006 census, its population was 333, in 79 families.

References 

Populated places in Farahan County